Dothan is an unincorporated community in Fayette County, West Virginia, United States. Dothan had a post office, which closed on October 5, 1991, when postmaster Lewis "Jackie" Toney retired. 

The community was named after the ancient city of Dothan, according to local history.

References

Unincorporated communities in Fayette County, West Virginia
Unincorporated communities in West Virginia
Coal towns in West Virginia